Eliza Brightwen née Elder (30 October 1830 – 5 May 1906) was a Scottish naturalist and author. She was self-taught, and many of her observations were made in the grounds of The Grove in Stanmore, the estate outside London which she shared with her husband during his lifetime and where she lived as a widow. She was described in 1912, as "one of the most popular naturalists of her day".

Personal life
Eliza Elder was born in 1830 in Banff, Aberdeenshire, Scotland to Margaret and George Elder, and she had three other siblings. Her mother died in 1837 and her father died in 1853. She was adopted, after her mother died, by her uncle, Alexander Elder, co-founder of Smith, Elder & Co.

Elder moved to Streatham to live with her uncle, and then to Stoke Newington. She did not receive a formal education. She expressed interest in natural history as a child and described her youth as "extremely lonely and quiet". In 1855 she married George Brightwen, a banker who then ran a successful business of his own. The couple moved to Stanmore and lived in a house called Elderslie, in Bushey, Hertfordshire.

Brightwen suffered from health problems, and had a nervous breakdown in 1872. She lived as a recluse for 10 years, with little to no contact with her husband and friends. She rarely left the house and did not read. When George Brightwen died in 1883 she emerged from reclusiveness, to be active intellectually and physically, but continued to suffer from body pains for the rest of her life. She still rarely left The Grove.

Brightwen lived in Stanmore until she died in May 1906. The house, The Grove, had an estate of 170 acres (69 hectares), where she did much of her research. The couple renovated the house to a design carried out by Brightwen Binyon. She turned the billiard room into a museum after her husband's death.

Eliza Brightwen was a philanthropist and attended church regularly. She died childless, and is buried at a church in Stanmore.

Work
Brightwen did much of her research on location in the woods and grounds of her home, The Grove. She started writing about her work when she was sixty. In 1890, she published Wild Nature Won by Kindness, about animal life. She became well known as a naturalist. In 1892, she published her second book, More about Wild Nature, followed by Inmates of my House and Garden, in 1895. It is considered her master work. She published a total of six publications during her lifetime. She socialized with Philip Henry Gosse (whose second wife, also named Eliza Brightwen, was her husband's sister), William Henry Flower, William Hooker, and James Paget. She also wrote about the concept of "home museums," as written in More about Wild Nature. The concept of home museums stems from her own home museum at The Grove.

On her death, a collection of essays were published titled Last Hours with Nature. An autobiography was also published, with an epilogue by her nephew Edmund Gosse.

Bibliography

Brightwen, Eliza. More about Wild Nature. (1892) 
Brightwen, Eliza. Inmates of my House and Garden. (1895) 
Brightwen, Eliza. Glimpses into Plant Life. (1898) 
Brightwen, Eliza. Rambles with Nature Students. (1899)
Brightwen, Eliza. Quiet Hours with Nature. (1903)
Brightwen, Eliza. The Life and Thoughts of a Naturalist (autobiographical writings, journal, etc. introduced by Edmund Gosse, edited by W. Chesson, 1909)
Eliza Brightwen. Eliza Brightwen, naturalist & philanthropist ; an autobiography. Edited by W. H. Chesson, with introduction and epilogue by Edmond Gosse. New York: American Tract Society (1909)

References

External links

 

1830 births
1906 deaths
19th-century British women writers
19th-century British writers
19th-century naturalists
19th-century Scottish scientists
19th-century Scottish women
20th-century naturalists
20th-century British women writers
People from Banff, Aberdeenshire
People from Stanmore
Scottish naturalists
Scottish nature writers
Scottish women scientists
Scottish women writers
Women naturalists